The 1994–95 Israel State Cup (Gvia HaMedina) was the 56th season of Israel's nationwide football cup competition and the 41st after the Israeli Declaration of Independence.

The competition was won by Maccabi Haifa who had beaten Hapoel Haifa 2–0 in the final.

By winning, Maccabi Haifa qualified to the 1995–96 UEFA Cup Winners' Cup, entering in the qualifying round.

Results

Seventh Round

Eighth Round

Round of 16

Quarter-finals

Semi-finals

Final

References
100 Years of Football 1906-2006, Elisha Shohat (Israel), 2006, p. 295
 1994/5 season: State Cup Final Between Maccabi Haifa to Hapoel Haifa youtube.com
Israel 1994/95 RSSSF
Sensation at the Cup: Shikun HaMizrah from Liga Bet eliminated Maccabi Jaffa (Article No. 58188) Haaretz, 29.1.1995, Haaretz Archive 

Israel State Cup
State Cup
Israel State Cup seasons